Panathinaikos AC women's football is a Greek team, part of the major Athens-based multi-sport club Panathinaikos A.O. It was first founded in 1980 and operated until 1982. In its short presence, it produced the athletes who starred in the following years, who were decisive factors for the development of women's football in Greece. On June 30, 2021, the reactivation of the department was officially announced.

History 
The women's football department of Panathinaikos was one of the first to be established in Greece. It was founded in 1980 under the responsibility of Panathinaikos F.C. The original roster was completed through a selection between 200 young athletes.

The technical leadership of the team was taken over successively by Spilios Zacharopoulos, Gómez de Faria and Takis Ikonomopoulos. The department operated from 1980 to 1982 and the activity of the team was limited to friendly matches with other women's teams but also with men's. The most talented athletes of Panathinaikos were the striker Georgia Tzani, whom coach Gómez de Faria used to call "white Pelé", and the stopper Fotini Karadima, who was also called "Novoselac". The leader of the team was Anna Kotsopoulou.

The absence of a domestic championship, which started in 1987, or other competitive events was condemnatory for the section, although it consisted of athletes with remarkable potential. In 1982 the division ceased to exist, but Panathinaikos players continued to compete together as they immediately founded "Doxa Athens" (later renamed to "Doxa Piraeus"), with which they won 4 championships in 5 years, losing only one in a draw.

Current squad

Technical and managerial staff

Honours 
 Greek 3rd division
 Winner (1): 2021–22

Notable players 
 Fotini Karadima
 Anna Kotsopoulou
 Yeoryia Tzani

Notable coaches 
 Gómez de Faria

Shirt manufacturers and sponsors

References

External links 
 
 EPO: Hellenic Football Federation - 3rd division women's championship - Group 6

1980 establishments in Greece
Association football clubs established in 1980
Panathinaikos A.O.
Sports clubs in Athens
Women's football clubs in Greece